The Battle of Fujian (August 1864 – June 1865) was fought between forces of the Qing Dynasty and rebels from the Taiping Heavenly Kingdom. By October 1864 around 12,000 pro-Taiping forces commanded by the Shi King Li Shixian had captured Jianning, Shaowu, Tingzhou and Zhangzhou. They held the city for several months until surrendering in the next summer. The Qing recovered territories in Fujian previously lost to the rebels.

References
 Draft History of Qing

 

Conflicts in 1864
Conflicts in 1865
1865 in China
1864 in China
Battles of the Taiping Rebellion
Military history of Fujian
August 1864 events
September 1864 events
October 1864 events
November 1864 events
December 1864 events
January 1865 events
February 1865 events
March 1865 events
April 1865 events
May 1865 events
June 1865 events